New Messiah may refer to

People
a new Messiah
David Koresh
"New Messiah Stage 3", from Japanese game Castlevania: The Adventure ReBirth

Music
New Messiah (Fear Factory song)
"New Messiah", single by Strange Nature
"A New Messiah", song by Diamond Head (band)
"Maybe I'm The New Messiah", a song by Deadguy
"A New Messiah", a song by Black Messiah from the album Oath of a Warrior
"New Messiah" a song by The Philosopher Kings, from the album Famous, Rich and Beautiful 1997
"The New Messiah", a song by Swedish band The Soundtrack of Our Lives from the album A Present from the Past
"The New Messiah", a 1985 12" EP by The Bomb Party
"New Messiah", a 1986 song by Secession remixed by Zeus B. Held
"New Messiah", a song from Frida Hyvönen Gives You: Music from the Dance Performance PUDEL